Gunnar Enock Sjölin (9 March 1924 – 20 July 2015) was a Swedish speed skater. He competed at the 1956 and 1960 Winter Olympics with the best result of 12th place in the 5000 m in 1956.

References

External links
 

1924 births
2015 deaths
Swedish male speed skaters
Olympic speed skaters of Sweden
Speed skaters at the 1956 Winter Olympics
Speed skaters at the 1960 Winter Olympics
20th-century Swedish people